The past denotes period of time that has already happened, in contrast to the present and the future.

The Past may also refer to:
 "The Past" (Sevendust song), 2008
 The Past (2007 film), Argentine film 
 The Past (2013 film), French film by the Iranian director Asghar Farhadi
 The Past (2018 film), Indian horror film
 The Past, book by Yu Dafu
 "The Past", song by Ray Parker Jr. from After Dark
 "The Past", song by Korn from Korn III: Remember Who You Are

See also 
 PAST (disambiguation)